Moscow State Stroganov Academy of Industrial and Applied Arts informally named Stroganovka (Строгановка) is one of the oldest Russian schools for the industrial, monumental and decorative art and design. The University is named after its founder, baron Sergei Grigoriyevich Stroganov.

History

The school was founded in 1825 by Baron Sergey Stroganov. It specialised on the applied and decorative art. In 1843 the school became state-owned. In 1860 it was renamed Stroganov School for Technical Drawing.

First Free State Art Workshops
After the October Revolution the school was reorganized and became one of the SVOMAS, known as the First Free State Art Workshops.

Later changes
Since 1930 it became the Moscow Institute for the Decorative and Applied Arts (Московский Институт Декоративного и Прикладного Искусства), MIDIPI (МИДИПИ). In 1945, after the end of the World War II the school was restored as an applied art educational establishment. Since 1996 the school was named Moscow State Stroganov University of Industrial and Applied Arts. In 2009 the school got its present name Moscow State Stroganov Academy of Industrial and Applied Arts.

Currently it is one of the most diverse artistic schools in Russia. It has three departments and thirteen chairs preparing students of six major and sixteen minor specializations.

Notable faculty and students

Aleksandr Adabashyan
Mikhail Mikhailovich Adamovich
André Andrejew
Tania Antoshina
Sergei Gerasimov
Konstantin Korovin
Nikolai Kuzmin
Nikolai Pomansky
Dmitry Shcherbinovsky
Alexey Shchusev
Vikentii Trofimov
Mikhail Vrubel

References

External links

 

Stroganov Moscow State Academy of Arts and Industry
Educational institutions established in 1825
1825 establishments in the Russian Empire